Henry Cattley (26 April 1887 – 4 April 1961) was a British gymnast. He competed in the men's team all-around event at the 1908 Summer Olympics.

References

External links
 

1887 births
1961 deaths
British male artistic gymnasts
Olympic gymnasts of Great Britain
Gymnasts at the 1908 Summer Olympics
Sportspeople from London